The German steam locomotive of Palatine Class Pts 2/2 of the Palatinate Railway was a one-off and was built by the firm of Maffei in Munich. Notable features were the high boiler and the locomotive frame used as a water tank. Coal was carried in two bunkers on the left and right of the driver's cab.

After the formation of the Deutsche Reichsbahn the engine was taken over and given the number '99 011'. It was retired by 1931.

See also 
 Royal Bavarian State Railways 
 Palatinate Railway 
 List of Bavarian locomotives and railbuses
 List of Palatine locomotives and railbuses

References

0-4-0T locomotives
Pts 2 2
Metre gauge steam locomotives
Railway locomotives introduced in 1916
Maffei locomotives
B h2t locomotives